The European Mid-Amateur Ladies' Championship is a European amateur golf championship, opened to women aged 25 or plus years old, organized by the European Golf Association. 

The championship was introduced in 2019 and is now played annually in conjunction with the European Mid-Amateur Men's Championship. The age limit lowered from 30 to 25 years old in 2021.

Format
The top 54 amateur players, aged from 25 years old, compete in a format consisting of three rounds of stroke play, with a cut after the second round out of which the lowest 33 ladies' scores can qualify for the final round.

Past results

''Source:

Multiple winners
2 wins: Myrte Eikenaar

See also
European Mid-Amateur Men's Championship – corresponding EGA event for men
U.S. Women's Mid-Amateur – corresponding USGA event

References

External links
European Golf Association: Full results

Amateur golf tournaments
European Golf Association championships
Recurring sporting events established in 2019